This is a list of films produced by 20th Century Studios from 2000 to 2020. For earlier releases, see List of 20th Century Fox films (1935–1999). For subsequent releases, see List of 20th Century Studios films.

2000s

2010s

2020s

See also 
 List of 20th Century Fox films (1935–1999)
 List of 20th Century Studios films
 List of Searchlight Pictures films
 20th Century Studios
 Searchlight Pictures
 :Category:Lists of films by studio

References

External links 
 

2000
20th Century Fox
Twentieth, 2000
Lists of films released by Disney
20th, 2000